KMDS is a radio station broadcasting on a frequency of 107.1 MHz on the FM band.  KMDS is currently owned by Sangre de Cristo Broadcasting.

The station broadcasts New Mexico State University sporting events.

References

External links

MDS (FM)
Radio stations established in 2015
2015 establishments in New Mexico